The Gorge (of) Orino or Canyon Red Butterfly is a canyon in southeastern Crete. It is located near the village of Oreino, Lasithi and is 5 km in length.

History 
In 1993, there was a major fire and the canyon was in a state of disaster. In the years following, the green vegetation and the canyon have been fully restored. Before the fire, there were countless red butterflies (hence the name of the canyon). These butterflies still exist but have been reduced to a great extent. 

The canyon starts from the village of Oreino and reaches Koutsouras about 21 kilometers east of Ierapetra. 

The Canyon Mountain has signs indicating the direction needed to be traveled. Despite these precautions, it is easy to get lost in the gorge.

Geography 
The canyon can be divided into three parts. The first part is green with lush vegetation. In the second part is a mountainous region. In the third part, towards the end of the gorge, the gorge rises, providing an unobstructed view of the mountain. 

One characteristic of the gorge is its many small streams and small waterfalls. 

The course varies with temperature. In the summer, the course does not exceed four hours. However, in the winter, the course might take longer due to sources and waterfalls running.

Gallery

References 
Orino Gorge (Red butterflies's Canyon )
Orino Gorge - From Koutsoura to Makry Gyalo\

External links

Gorges of Crete